The 1973 Berwick-upon-Tweed by-election was a parliamentary  by-election held on 8 November 1973 for the House of Commons constituency of Berwick-upon-Tweed. It was one of four UK by-elections held on the same day.

The by-election took place during the 1970s Liberal Party revival. This was the fifth Liberal gain during the 1970-1974 Parliament. Although largely overshadowed by the Scottish National Party's spectacular victory in Glasgow Govan on the same day, it was the narrowest by-election result since the Carmarthen by-election in 1928, forty-five years earlier.

Previous MP 
The seat had become vacant when the constituency's Conservative Member of Parliament (MP), Antony Claud Frederick Lambton, resigned following a private scandal. To resign from the House of Commons he asked to be appointed to the sinecure office of Steward of the Chiltern Hundreds, which appointment was made on 1 June 1973. The Stewardship is a notional office of profit under the Crown, appointment to which vacates an MPs seat in Parliament. Lambton, a Conservative, had been MP for the constituency since 1951.

Antony Lambton (10 July 1922 – 30 December 2006), was briefly the 6th Earl of Durham in 1970 but disclaimed that title to remain in the House of Commons. He was known before 1970 by the courtesy title of Viscount Lambton, a style he continued to claim after renouncing his peerage.

Candidates 
Five candidates were nominated. The list below is set out in descending order of the number of votes received at the by-election.

1. The Liberal Party candidate was Alan James Beith, born on 20 April 1943. He was a lecturer in politics and a local Councillor. Beith had contested the constituency in the 1970 general election, finishing third.

Beith won the by-election and retained the seat until his retirement in 2015, and by the 2010 election was the longest serving Liberal Democrat MP.

Beith was the Liberal Party Chief Whip 1977-1985 and Deputy Leader 1985-1988. Following the formation of the (Social and) Liberal Democrats in 1988, he contested the party leadership. Beith subsequently became Deputy Leader of the Parliamentary Party, a post he held from 1992 until 2003.

2. The Conservative candidate was J.D.M. Hardie. He had previously contested the Scottish seats of West Stirlingshire in 1966 and Berwickshire and East Lothian in 1970.

After losing the by-election, Hardie again contested the seat in the February 1974 general election.

3. The Labour Party was represented by Dr Gordon Johnston Adam, a mining engineer (born 28 March 1934). At the 1966 general election, Adam was the Labour Party candidate for the Tynemouth constituency.

In August 1973, he was chosen to fight the byelection in Berwick-upon-Tweed, and decided to focus on the issues of housing and prices. The Times Diary noted that Labour had drafted 13 professionals in to lead their campaign but described Adam as "a charm-free technocrat". Adam saw Labour overtaken by the Liberal Party who narrowly won the seat; he took comfort that the Labour vote had held firm.

Adam again contested the constituency in the February 1974 general election. He was a member of the European Parliament from 1979 until he retired in 2004 (apart from six months in 1999).

4. T.G. Symonds was an Independent candidate. Tim Symonds then joined the Liberal Party and became the Liberal Parliamentary candidate in Newcastle East in the late-1974 general election.  In 1980 he co-founded with Lesley Abdela the all-Party 300 Group for Women in Politics.

5. Robert Goodall was an Independent candidate. He had previously contested West Derbyshire in 1944, 1945 and 1967, and the 1971 Macclesfield by-election, finishing bottom of the poll each time.

Votes

See also
 Berwick-upon-Tweed constituency
 List of United Kingdom by-elections (1950–1979)
 United Kingdom by-election records
 1973 Edinburgh North by-election
 1973 Glasgow Govan by-election
 1973 Hove by-election

References
 British Parliamentary Election Results 1950-1973, compiled and edited by F.W.S. Craig (Parliamentary Research Services 1983)
 Who's Who of British Members of Parliament, Volume IV 1945-1979, edited by M. Stenton and S. Lees (Harvester Press 1981)

1973 elections in the United Kingdom
1973 in England
November 1973 events in the United Kingdom
By-elections to the Parliament of the United Kingdom in Northumberland constituencies
History of Berwick-upon-Tweed
20th century in Northumberland